, known as Block Hole outside Japan, is a hybrid puzzle/shoot 'em up game developed by Konami which was released in 1989 as an arcade game. Besides the arcade version, there were also ports of the game to the MSX2 (with a built-in SCC chip), Famicom, and Game Boy—home releases used the Quarth name worldwide (with the exception of the Game Boy Color release in Europe of Konami GB Collection Vol. 2, where the game was renamed to the generic title Block Game for unknown reasons).

Quarth was released on the Konami Net i-mode service as Block Quarth, with an updated Block Quarth DX in 2001. It was released without the "DX" suffix in 2005 and was made globally available through Konami Net licensing on many i-mode services offered by mobile operators. In Europe, for example, it was available from O2 UK, O2 Ireland, and Telefónica Spain.

In 2005, Konami also included the game in the Nintendo DS title Ganbare Goemon: Tōkaidōchū Ōedo Tengurikaeshi no Maki. An emulated version of the game was released in 2006 for PlayStation 2 in Japan as part of the Oretachi Geasen Zoku Sono series.

Gameplay 

Quarth is a combination of Tetris-style gameplay and a fixed shooter in the Space Invaders tradition. The player's focus is on falling blocks, and the action is geometrical. Rather than arranging the blocks together to make a row of disappearing blocks, a spaceship positioned at the bottom of the screen shoots blocks upwards to make the falling block pattern into squares or rectangles. Once the blocks have been arranged properly, the shape is destroyed and the player is awarded points based on the shape's size. The blocks continue to drop from the top of the screen in various incomplete shapes. As each level progresses, the blocks drop at greater speed and frequency. There are also various power-ups which could be located to increase your ship's speed, among other bonuses.

The game continues until the blocks reach the dotted line at the bottom of the screen, whereupon the player's ship is "player's ship is "quarthed", crushed flat.

Multiplayer 
The Arcade, MSX2, and Famicom versions had two different 2-player modes: a split-screen mode with Player 1 on the left and Player 2 on the right, and a cooperative mode where both players shared the same screen.

For the Game Boy, multiplayer requires the Game Boy Link Cable with each player able to view only their fields on their own Game Boys.

Merchandise

Soundtrack 
 In addition, disc 14 of Konami Music Masterpiece Collection, which was released on October 1, 2004, is mostly devoted to Quarth.

Manga 
 Quarth is one of the video games featured in the manga titled Rock'n Game Boy, by Shigeto Ikehara and Published by Comic BomBom October 1989 to December 1991.

Reception
In Japan, Game Machine listed Quarth on their December 1, 1989 issue as being the third most-successful table arcade unit of the month. Block Hole was a hit overseas in Europe, particularly the United Kingdom and Italy.

It has been generally acclaimed by many online reviewers, though Nintendo Life gave the Game Boy port on the 3DS Virtual Console a 6/10.

References

External links

1989 video games
Arcade video games
Falling block puzzle games
Game Boy games
Konami games
Mobile games
MSX2 games
NEC PC-9801 games
Nintendo Entertainment System games
Nintendo Switch games
PlayStation 4 games
X68000 games
Shoot 'em ups
Virtual Console games
Virtual Console games for Wii U
Split-screen multiplayer games
Konami arcade games
Video games developed in Japan
Hamster Corporation games